The 1943 municipal election was held November 10, 1943 to elect a mayor and five aldermen to sit on Edmonton City Council and four trustees to sit on the public school board, while four trustees were acclaimed to the separate school board.

There were ten aldermen on city council, but five of the positions were already filled: Athelstan Bissett (SS), Sidney Bowcott, Frederick John Mitchell, James Ogilvie, and Sidney Parsons were all elected to two-year terms in 1942 and were still in office.

There were seven trustees on the public school board, but three of the positions were already filled: Izena Ross, William McConachie, and Alex Gemeroy had been elected to two-year terms in 1942 and were still in office.  The same was true of the separate board, where Adrien Crowe (SS), Francis Killeen, and James O'Hara were continuing.

Voter turnout

There were 10,442 ballots cast out of 58,406 eligible voters, for a voter turnout of 17.8%.

Results

 bold or  indicates elected
 italics indicate incumbent
 "SS", where data is available, indicates representative for Edmonton's South Side, with a minimum South Side representation instituted after the city of Strathcona, south of the North Saskatchewan River, amalgamated into Edmonton on February 1, 1912.

Mayor

Aldermen

Public school trustees

Separate (Catholic) school trustees

William Wilde (SS), Joseph Gallant, Thomas Malone, and J O Pilon were acclaimed.

References

Election History, City of Edmonton: Elections and Census Office

1943
1943 elections in Canada
1943 in Alberta